Sovijja Pou (born 18 July 1995) is an American-Cambodian competition swimmer who competes mainly in the freestyle and butterfly events. In the 2015 Southeast Asian Games, he broke four of Cambodia's national swimming records (100m freestyle, 400m freestyle, 100m butterfly, 200m butterfly). He competed in the men's 100 metre freestyle event at the 2016 Summer Olympics, event where he ranked at 57th with a time of 54.55 seconds. He did not advance to the semifinals.

References

External links
 

1995 births
Living people
Cambodian male butterfly swimmers
Cambodian male freestyle swimmers
Olympic swimmers of Cambodia
Swimmers at the 2016 Summer Olympics
Sportspeople from Baltimore
American people of Cambodian descent